Jaimee Lovett (born 5 May 1988, in Whakatane) is a New Zealand canoeist.

She represented New Zealand at the 2016 Summer Olympics. She competed alongside Caitlin Ryan, Kayla Imrie and Aimee Fisher in the Women's K-4 500 metres event. After having trained together for just 18 months, the young crew achieved a fifth place in the medal race.

Of Māori descent, Lovett affiliates to Waikato Tainui and Ngāti Raukawa.

References

External links
 
 
 

1988 births
Living people
Olympic canoeists of New Zealand
Canoeists at the 2016 Summer Olympics
New Zealand female canoeists
Waikato Tainui people
Ngāti Raukawa people